Karl Maxence Namnganda (born 8 February 1996) is a Central African footballer who plays as a forward for the Central African Republic national team.

Career
Namnganda began his career with Évry, and moved to the reserves of Cholet in 2016. He worked his way into the squad in 2019, making an appearance in the Championnat National. He followed that up with a move to Pouzauges in 2019, and then to Les Herbiers in the summer of 2021.

International career
Namnganda  made his debut with the Central African Republic national team in a 1–0 2022 FIFA World Cup qualification loss to Liberia on 6 September 2021.

References

External links
 
 Les Herbiers Profile
 

1996 births
Living people
People from Bangui
Central African Republic footballers
Central African Republic international footballers
Association football forwards
Championnat National players
Championnat National 2 players
Championnat National 3 players
Central African Republic expatriate footballers
Central African Republic expatriates in France
Expatriate footballers in France